Microsoft IntelliPoint is the Microsoft-branded software driver for the company's hardware mice. Microsoft has released versions for both Windows and Mac OS X.  It has been succeeded by Microsoft Mouse and Keyboard Center, which combines IntelliType (a Microsoft keyboard driver) with IntelliPoint.

Features
Software features may only be available with certain mice models. (Button options are specific to the selected model.) On Mac OS X 10.4-10.7.x, IntelliPoint features can be accessed by opening Microsoft Mouse in System Preferences.

Depending on the software version and specific mouse product, users can define mouse buttons to run any executable program or file they desire (or a control key + letter combination) and can even define buttons for different functions in chosen programs.

With IntelliPoint 4, users were able to specify mouse wheel behavior to scroll one screen at a time. This feature was useful in situations where the user had to work with windows of varying size and a fixed scroll rate alternated from being too fast or too slow depending on each window. This feature was incorporated into the Windows XP operating system and removed in IntelliPoint 5.  The "Alt+Tab" button combination was also replaced with "Next Window," effectively preventing users from alternating between specific programs, and instead having to cycle through one by one (although this can be hacked back in the registry).

Scrolling

Universal Scrolling is a software function within IntelliPoint that allows a scroll wheel to work with programs that do not natively support that method of input. If a program supports scroll wheels natively, the Universal Scrolling feature will generally not interfere with the native implementation.

Supported mice
IntelliPoint supports older models of Microsoft mice, as well as generic 3/5-button mice. 

Note: Version 8.0 and above dropped PS/2 support for the following list. As even adapters cannot assist, Microsoft keeps version 7.1 as an offered download for users who still own mice with PS/2 connectors (instead of USB).
 Arc
 Arc Touch
 Basic Optical Mouse
 Basic Optical Mouse v2.0
 Comfort Optical Mouse 3000
 Comfort Optical Mouse 500 v2.0
 IntelliMouse
 IntelliMouse Explorer 2.0
 IntelliMouse Explorer 3.0
 IntelliMouse Explorer 4.0
 IntelliMouse Explorer for Bluetooth
 IntelliMouse Optical
 Explorer Mouse
 Explorer Touch Mouse
 Explorer Mini Mouse
 Laser Mouse 6000
 Mobile Memory Mouse 8000
 Mobile Optical Mouse
 Natural Wireless Laser Mouse 6000
 Notebook Optical Mouse
 Notebook Optical Mouse 3000
 Optical Mouse
 Optical Mouse by Starck
 Sculpt Comfort Mouse
 Sculpt Mobile Mouse
 Sculpt Touch Mouse
 SideWinder Mouse
 SideWinder x8 Mouse (for gaming)
 Standard Wireless Mouse
 Touch Mouse
 Trackball Explorer
 Trackball Optical
 Wheel Mouse
 Wheel Mouse Optical
 Wireless IntelliMouse Explorer 2.0
 Wireless IntelliMouse Explorer for Bluetooth
 Wireless IntelliMouse Explorer with Fingerprint Reader
 Wireless Laser Mouse 5000
 Wireless Laser Mouse 6000
 Wireless Laser Mouse 6000 v2.0
 Wireless Laser Mouse 7000
 Wireless Laser Mouse 8000
 Wireless Notebook Laser Mouse 6000
 Wireless Notebook Laser Mouse 7000
 Wireless Notebook Optical Mouse
 Wireless Notebook Optical Mouse 3000
 Wireless Notebook Optical Mouse 4000
 Wireless Notebook Presenter Mouse 8000
 Wireless Notebook Mouse 5000
 Wireless Optical Mouse 2.0
 Wireless Optical Mouse 2000
 Wireless Optical Mouse 5000 (also Wireless IntelliMouse Explorer 2.0)

References

External links

Universal Scrolling
Description of Universal Scrolling Feature for Microsoft IntelliPoint

Microsoft software
Utilities for macOS
Utilities for Windows